Mournies is a village in Crete, in the regional unit of Chania. Between 1997 and 2010, it was the seat of the former municipality of Eleftherios Venizelos. Mournies is famous for being the place of birth of the statesman Eleftherios Venizelos.

References

Populated places in Chania (regional unit)